In geveb: A Journal of Yiddish Studies (Yiddish: אין געװעב) is an open-access digital forum for the publication of peer-reviewed academic articles, the translation and annotation of Yiddish texts, the presentation of digitized archival documents, the exchange of pedagogical materials, and a blog about Yiddish culture. The journal publishes multidisciplinary research from scholars in Jewish studies, Germanic languages, history, sociology, theater history, art history, and literary studies, among other fields. The name In geveb was inspired by a collection of poetry by the Yiddish writer Yehoyash. 

Zachary M. Baker's "Resources in Yiddish Studies," published by In geveb, received Honorable Mention from the Association of Jewish Libraries in their 2018 Reference and Bibliography Awards.

In geveb is sponsored by the Naomi Foundation.

History
In 2015, In geveb was founded by David Roskies to replace a previous Yiddish journal which ceased publication in 2008.

Since 2018, Yiddish professor and researcher at the University of Chicago Jessica Kirzane has been the journal's editor-in-chief.

The Milgroym Project
In geveb is collaborating with Tel Aviv University and the National Library of Israel's Historical Jewish Press project to publish full-color scans and translations from rare Yiddish avant-garde journals originally published between the two world wars. The first such journal to be published was Milgroym, published in Berlin from 1922 to 1924, from which the project takes its name.

References

External links
 

Yiddish-language mass media
Publications established in 2015
Area studies journals